Nea Lehtola (born 24 October 1998) is a Finnish footballer who plays as a midfielder for Danish Women's League club Brøndby IF and the Finland women's national team.

References

1998 births
Living people
Finnish women's footballers
Women's association football midfielders
Helsingin Jalkapalloklubi (women) players
Kansallinen Liiga players
Finland women's international footballers